Bullavirinae is a subfamily of viruses in the family Microviridae. Enterobacteria serve as natural hosts. There are 14 species in this subfamily, organized into three genera.

Taxonomy
The following genera and species are recognized:
 Genus: Alphatrevirus; species:
 Escherichia virus alpha3
 Escherichia virus ID21
 Escherichia virus ID32
 Escherichia virus ID62
 Escherichia virus NC28
 Escherichia virus NC29
 Escherichia virus NC35
 Escherichia virus phiK
 Escherichia virus St1
 Escherichia virus WA45
 Genus: Gequatrovirus; species:
 Escherichia virus G4
 Escherichia virus ID52 
 Escherichia virus Talmos
 Genus: Sinsheimervirus; species:
 Escherichia virus phiX174

Structure
Viruses in Bullavirinae are non-enveloped, with icosahedral and round geometries, and T=1 symmetry. The diameter is around 30 nm. Genomes are circular, around 6.1kb in length.

Life cycle
Viral replication is cytoplasmic. Entry into the host cell is achieved by pilus-mediated adsorption into the host cell. Replication follows the ssDNA rolling circle model. DNA-templated transcription is the method of transcription. The virus exits the host cell by bacteria lysis.

Enterobacteria serve as the natural host. Transmission routes are passive diffusion.

References

External links
 Viralzone: Microvirus
 ICTV

Microviridae